The 36th Writers Guild of America Awards honored the best television, and film writers of 1983. Winners were announced in 1984.

Winners & Nominees

Film 
Winners are listed first highlighted in boldface.

Television

Special Awards

References

External links 

 WGA.org

1983
W
Writers Guild of America Awards
Writers Guild of America Awards
Writers Guild of America Awards